This is the electoral history of Eric Adams, the current Mayor of New York City. Previously, he was Brooklyn Borough President from 2013 to 2021, and a member of the New York State Senate from the 20th district from 2007 to 2013.

New York State Senate elections

2008

2010

2012

Brooklyn Borough President elections

2017

New York City Mayoral election

The following table shows the official results of votes as counted in a series of rounds of instant runoffs. Each voter could mark which candidates were the voter's first through fifth choices. In each round, the vote is counted for the most preferred candidate that has not yet been eliminated. Then one or more candidates with the fewest votes are eliminated. Two or more candidates will be eliminated in one round when those candidates' combined votes are less than the candidate immediately ahead of them.  Votes that counted for an eliminated candidate are transferred to the voter's next most preferred candidate that has not yet been eliminated. Voters were allowed to mark five choices because of voting system limitations.

On June 29, the New York City Board of Elections became aware of a discrepancy in the unofficial results and subsequently posted in a tweet that both test and election night results were tallied together in an error, adding approximately 135,000 additional votes.

On July 6, after new vote tallies were released, Adams was declared the winner of the primary by the Associated Press.

References 

Adams, Eric
Eric Adams